Patliputra Junction, Station code (PPTA), is a railway station in the Rukanpura area in the West End of Patna, Bihar. The station, which is governed by East Central Railway and managed by Danapur railway division, lies on the Patna–Sonepur–Hajipur section. Located 12 kilometres north-west of Patna Junction, it has primarily been developed to ease pressure on the city's other two railway stations, through which roughly 350 trains pass daily. It is located near Bailey Road, an important western thoroughfare in Patna. Patliputra junction has become the fourth terminal of the Danapur railway division after Patna Junction, Danapur station and Rajendranagar Terminal.

Patna lies in between New Delhi and Kolkata, one of the busiest rail routes in India. In January 2016, the construction of India's longest road-cum-rail bridge, the Digha–Sonpur rail–road bridge, was completed on the banks of the Ganga nearby and connect Patna to Bharpura Pahleja Ghat (Sonpur).

History 

The Patliputra Junction railway station was built in 2013. The railway station is a part of Digha–Sonpur rail–road bridge between Digha and Sonepur which was completed by the end of 2015. This station was built an alternate to Patna Junction, Danapur station and Rajendranagar Terminal to decongest excess load on these stations. The station will be a terminal point for most of the train coming from North Bihar.

Facilities 
The major facilities available are waiting rooms, computerized reservation facility, reservation counter, vehicle parking etc. The vehicles are allowed to enter the station premises. There are refreshment rooms vegetarian and non vegetarian, tea stall, book stall, post and telegraphic office and government railway police office. Patliputra Junction is located close to the domestic airport providing transport to important destinations to all over India. Patliputra Junction will soon have a second exit point at the west-northern end. There will be a gate for movement to and from the platform (Pillar No. 216) from under AIIMS-Digha elevated road (Patli Path) near Patliputra Junction. From Rupaspur one will reach the junction by road from the side of the line.

Automatic ticket vending machines have been installed to reduce the queue for train tickets on the station.

Platforms 
There are three platforms with four railway tracks and all the platforms are connected with one main foot overbridge. Two more platforms are under construction.

New developments 
In Feb 2012, The Indian Railways had planned to set up a Railway Station Development Corporation (RSDC)  that will work on improving the major railway stations including Patliputra Junction by building and developing Restaurants, shopping areas and food plaza for commercial business and improving passenger amenities A new railway station has been constructed (Digha Bridge Halt railway station) at south end of bridge just south of Danapur Bankipur Road situated 3 km northward from Patliputra Junction. This makes traveling from Sonpur side very easy and passengers traveling to Gandhi Maidan will save money and at least 1.5 hours time than deboarding the trains at Patliputra Junction station.

See also 

 Patna
Danapur railway station

References

External links 

Railway stations in Patna
Danapur railway division
Railway stations in India opened in 2015
Railway junction stations in Bihar